Football is Ethiopia's most popular sport. Ethiopia has produced numerous exceptional clubs and international teams, as well as some talented individual players, despite not being one of Africa's main footballing nations.
Years in the beginning. This is a list of football (soccer) clubs in Ethiopia.  
For a complete list see :Category:Football clubs in Ethiopia

A
Adama City FC
Areka City
Ambericho FC 
Awassa City FC

B
Banks SC
Bahirdar Ketema Football Club
Beer Bottling Football Club
Boditi City

D
Dashen Beer
Defence 
Dire Dawa City
Dedebit F.C.

E
EEPCO 
Ethiopian Coffee 
Ethiopian Insurance

F
 Fasil Kenema Sport Club

H
Harrar Beer Bottling F.C.

M
Metehara Sugar 
Muger Cement
 Mekelle ketema FC

N
Nyala SC

S
Saint-George SA 
Sebeta City 
Shashemene City
Sidama Coffee
Southern Police
Wolaita Sodo City FC

T
Trans Ethiopia 
Tikur Abay Transport

W
Wonji Sugar
 Woldia Sport Club
 Wolaita Dicha

References

 
Ethiopia
Football clubs
Football clubs